The Portugal Day Festival in Newark, New Jersey is a street festival celebrating the Portuguese people, language, and their culture.  First organized in 1979 by the Bernardino Coutinho Foundation, since 2010 the Festival has been organized by the Union of Portuguese American Clubs of New Jersey (União de Clubes Luso-Americanos de New Jersey), or UCLANJ. Although various events occur the week prior, the actual street festival typically takes place on the weekend closest to June 10, the official Portugal Day. As of 2015 the festival has been run by its official Portugal Day Newark a 501c (3) non-profit organization. The festival is known to attract over 750,000 event goers to Ferry Street in the Ironbound.

The festival went on hiatus in 2020.

Facts About Portugal:
The cultural festival takes months of planning.  Plans include inviting guests to be Grand Marshal, Honorary Grand Marshal, or any of the prized people in attendance over the Portugal Day weekend.  There are also many events prior to the big weekend, such as the Friendship Night Gala, that bring out the Portuguese community.

Television broadcast

The festivities are often telecast, live or recorded, to stations not only in New Jersey, but also in Portugal and Portuguese-speaking countries in Africa and South America.

Portugal Day Races 
The Portugal Day Races take place every year on the Sunday morning of Portugal Day weekend prior to the parade. Every year runners and walkers, Portuguese or not, gather and race in the historic Ironbound section, celebrating Portuguese-American culture.

The race was founded in 1979 by the late Manuel Parente and was directed for many years by the late Domingos Cravo. The races have always been organized by Lar Dos Leos (Den of Lions). In honor of Parente's and Cravo's contributions to the Portuguese community, the "Cravo Kid Dash" and the "Parente Mile" have been named in their honor. The 5k race has also been renamed as the "Jack Casimiro 5k" in honor of a longtime sponsor of the Portugal Day Races, the late Jack Casimiro. Today, the race is still organized by Lar Dos Leos (Den of Lions) and by longtime race director Carlos Martins.

Parade
On the Sunday of that weekend, there is a parade with many floats representing various organizations from throughout the state, both Portuguese and non-Portuguese.  Every year there is a Honorary Grand Marshal, a Grand Marshal, as well as many other prized personalities.

References

External links
 Welcome to the Portugal Day Festival (2009)
 Union of Portuguese-American Clubs of New Jersey (UCLANJ: União de Clubes Luso-Americanos de New Jersey)
 Portugal Day Races (Portugal Day Races in Newark NJ: 5km, 1 Mile Run, Kiddy Dash)

Festivals in New Jersey
Culture of Newark, New Jersey
Tourist attractions in Newark, New Jersey
Cultural festivals in the United States
Portuguese-American culture in New Jersey
Festivals established in 1979
1979 establishments in New Jersey